Moses the Lawgiver is a 6-hour Italian/British television miniseries filmed in 1973/74 and starring Burt Lancaster as Moses. It was an ITC/RAI co-production filmed in Rome and on location in Israel and Morocco.

Many of the writers, cast and crew contributed to another ITC/RAI Biblical co-production, the ambitious miniseries Jesus of Nazareth, released in 1977.

Plot summary
The Story of the Exodus or freedom of Hebrews from Egypt is told in a perspective which highlights Moses' efforts to persuade first the stubborn Pharaoh Merneptah, who was his adopted cousin, to release his work force of slaves. Then, once free and in the wilderness en route to the Promised Land, Moses must prove to be a pious and patient leader or lawgiver to a people who still think they want more out of him or God. For 40 years, Moses (Burt Lancaster) must carry on this load and challenge for God and Israel.

With the help of his brother Aaron (Anthony Quayle), and Joshua (Aharon Ipale), the nation or people of Israel are officially born or created after centuries ago God promised and vowed Jacob/Israel that he would be the father of a mighty nation.

Cast 
 Burt Lancaster as Moses
 Anthony Quayle as Aaron
 Ingrid Thulin as Miriam
 Irene Papas as Zipporah
 Aharon Ipale as Joshua
 Yosef Shiloach as Dathan
 Marina Berti as Eliseba
 Shmuel Rodensky as Jethro
 Mariangela Melato as The Princess Bithiah
 Laurent Terzieff as Pharaoh Merneptah
 Michele Placido as Caleb
 Antonio Piovanelli as Korah
 Jacques Herlin as The Magician
 Umberto Raho and José Quaglio as two of The Pharaoh's Ministers
 Melba Englander as Merneptah's Wife
 Marco Steiner as The Young Merneptah
 William Lancaster as The Young Moses
 Galia Kohn as The Young Miriam
 Mosko Alkalai as Amram
 Dina Doron as Jochebed
 Yossi Werzansky as Eleazar
 Richard Johnson as The Narrator

Production
As Charlton Heston's son Fraser acted out the infant Moses in the 1956 Hollywood production of The Ten Commandments, so Burt Lancaster's son Bill, credited as William Lancaster, acted out the role of Moses as a young man in Moses the Lawgiver.

The Italian government suggested to the series' producer, Lew Grade, that he should meet Pope Paul VI, and subsequently did so at his wife's insistence. Grade and his wife Kathie had a private audience with Paul who told them of his pleasure at the film and offered his endorsement to be used for publicity purposes. Paul suggested to Grade that his next film should be called 'In the footsteps of Jesus', the Pope's suggestion developed into the miniseries Jesus of Nazareth.

Soundtrack
The "Moses Theme" was composed by Ennio Morricone; the original music was performed by Gianna Spagnulo and Coro e Orchestra dell'Unione Musicisti Romani.

Novelization
In 1975, a tie-in book, written by Australian author Thomas Keneally, was published by Harper & Row.

Theatrical and DVD releases 
The 360-minute-long mini-series was later edited into a 141-minute version for theatrical release under the title "Moses." In 2004, this shortened version was released as a one-disc DVD. A 300-minute version (two-disc set) was released in 2012 for Latin America (but not dubbed into Spanish and compatible in both Regions 1 & 4); it was packaged (somewhat deceptively) as Moises y los 10 Mandamientos-Extended Version.

Contrary to the above-mentioned information, the 300-minute version may in fact be the complete version. This was aired as (6) one-hour episodes on television originally. Subtracting for commercials, the average running time for a 60-minute TV program in the mid 1970s was around 50 minutes; 25 minutes for a 30-minute program. This would make 300 minutes the proper uncut running time, since (6) 50-minute episodes equals 300 minutes. There is no source available claiming that the (6) hour-long TV episodes ran commercial-free, which would be the only way the total running time could be 360 minutes, as claimed in the first paragraph. In addition, Shout Factory TV has the 6 episodes available and they all run 50 minutes plus a few seconds each.

The miniseries was released on Region 1 DVD by S'More Entertainment in the US on May 14, 2019. It is 2-discs with a total running time of 300 minutes, which does seem to be the complete version.

References

External links

Television series by ITC Entertainment
1974 films
Films based on the Book of Exodus
Films set in ancient Egypt
Films set in the 13th century BC
Television shows based on the Bible
Cultural depictions of Moses
British television films
Television series by ITV Studios
Films scored by Ennio Morricone
1970s English-language films